The 2012–13 Copa Federación de España is the 20th staging of the Copa Federación de España, a knockout competition for Spanish football clubs in Segunda División B and Tercera División.

The competition began on 1 August 2012.

Autonomous Communities tournaments

Andalusia and Ceuta tournament
Only Coria joins the tournament.

Andalusia and Melilla tournament
Only Almería B joins the tournament.

Aragon tournament

First round

|}

Semifinals

|}

Final

|}

Asturias tournament

Qualifying tournament

Group A

Group B

Group C

Group D

Semifinals

|}

Final

|}

Balearic Islands tournament

First round

|}

Semifinal

|}

Final

|}
Awarded

Basque Country tournament

Final

|}

Canary Islands tournament
Only Tenerife B joins the tournament.

Cantabria tournament

Semifinals

|}

Final

|}

Castile and León tournament

Semifinals

|}

Final

|}

Castile-La Mancha tournament

Semifinals

|}

Final

|}

Catalonia tournament

Final

|}

Extremadura tournament

First round

|}

Second round

|}

Third round

|}

Final

|}

Galicia tournament

First round

|}

Semifinal

|}

Final

|}

La Rioja tournament

First round

|}

Semifinals

|}

Final

|}

Madrid tournament

Qualifying tournament

Group 1

Group 2

Final

|}

Murcia tournament

Semifinals

|}

Final

|}

Navarre tournament

Final

|}

Valencian Community tournament
Only At. Saguntino joins the tournament.

Teams directly qualified for national phase

Current champion
Binissalem

Teams losing Copa del Rey first round
Marino
Real Ávila
Fuenlabrada
UD Logroñés
Amorebieta (withdrew)
Laudio
Peña Sport
Orihuela
Villarrobledo
At. Baleares (withdrew)
Yeclano
Gimnàstic de Tarragona (withdrew)
Badalona (withdrew)
San Roque
La Roda
Loja
Cartagena
Catarroja

National phase

Qualifying round 

|}

First leg

Second leg

La Hoya Lorca won 3–1 on aggregate

Round of 32 
The draw for the qualifying round and Round of 32 was October 30.
The tie was decided over two legs between 28 November and 6 December 2012.

|}

First leg

Second leg

Villarrubia won 4–3 on aggregate

Fuenlabrada won 9–1 on aggregate

At. Saguntino won 4–2 on aggregate

Villarrobledo won 1–0 on aggregate

Burgos won 2–1 on aggregate

Rápido de Bouzas won 4–0 on aggregate

Binissalem won 1–1 on away goals rule

Loja won 9–2 on aggregate

San Roque won after extra time and penalty shootout (1–3)

Zaragoza B won 2–0 on aggregate

Sant Andreu won 5–2 on aggregate

Cartagena won 4–3 on aggregate

La Hoya Lorca won after extra time and penalty shootout (4–2)

Peña Sport won 5–0 on aggregate

Laudio won 5–1 on aggregate

Round of 16 
The draw was held on December 14. The tie will be decided over two legs between days 10 and 24 January 2013.

|}

First leg

Second leg

Peña Sport won 5–2 on aggregate

Burgos won 5–2 on aggregate

Sant Andreu won 7–5 on aggregate

Zaragoza B won 9–3 on aggregate

Tenerife B won 5–3 on aggregate

Binissalem won 1–1 on away goals rule

Cartagena won 4–2 on aggregate

La Hoya Lorca won 5–1 on aggregate

Quarter-finals 
The draw for the quarterfinals was held January 25.

|}

First leg

Second leg

Sant Andreu won 7–5 on aggregate after extra time

Zaragoza B won 2–1 on aggregate

La Hoya Lorca won 3–2 on aggregate

Tenerife B won 3–3 on away goals rule

Semi-finals 
The draw for the semi-finals and Final was held February 22.

|}

First leg

Second leg

La Hoya Lorca won 2–1 on aggregate after extra time

Sant Andreu won 4–0 on aggregate

Final 

|}

First leg

Second leg

Notes and references

2012-13
3
2012–13 Segunda División B
2012–13 Tercera División